The 2020 Judo Grand Slam Düsseldorf was held at the ISS Dome in Düsseldorf, Germany from 21 to 23 February 2020.

Medal summary

Men's events

Women's events

Source Results

Medal table

References

External links
 

2020 IJF World Tour
2020 Judo Grand Slam
Judo
Judo
Judo